Michael McShane may refer to:

Michael J. McShane, American judge
Mike McShane, American actor and comedian
Mike McShane (ice hockey), American ice hockey coach